Edward Little High School is a public high school in Auburn, Maine, United States that was first established as Lewiston Falls Academy in 1835. Philanthropist Edward Little donated  and considerable money to the academy, which was named in his honor. The school is now situated on a  tract of land overlooking the city from the top of Goff Hill in Auburn Heights.

History

1834-1959 

The school was first commissioned by the Maine State Legislature as Lewiston Falls Academy. Little contributed numerous resources to the school, including land and money. It was renamed to the Edward Little Institute in September 1849. When the City of Auburn was given control over the school in April 1874, it came with the condition that the school always be named in honor of Edward Little. At the beginning of the 1930s, a second building was erected. The school suffered a fire that destroyed the entire third floor in 1943.

1960-present 
In 1961, the building currently used as Edward Little High School was completed. It cost US$1.9 million to build.

In June 2009, the school was placed on probation by the New England Association of Schools and Colleges. Reasons cited for this probation included "the poor and inadequate condition of the school's kitchen facility...the insufficient heating system," and low funding for educational resources and technology.

Athletics 

The school's sports teams are known as the Red Eddies, with the ghost of Edward Little as their mascot. The school is a member of the Kennebec Valley Athletic Conference. The school's most successful teams in recent years include Alpine ski racing, soccer, basketball and track and field. Other sports offered include soccer, baseball, cheering, cross country, football, lacrosse, swimming, ice and field hockey, and tennis.

Notable alumni
 Charles B. Carter, American football player, lawyer, politician
 Alonzo Conant, municipal court judge (1946–1958)
 Larry Gowell, MLB pitcher
 Gina Melaragno, member of the Maine House of Representatives
 Bert Roberge, MLB pitcher
 Luke Robinson, professional wrestler
 Dave Rowe, musician
 Tom Rowe, musician
 Olympia Snowe, former U.S. senator
 Peter Snowe, member of the Maine House of Representatives
 Pamela White, U.S. ambassador
 George C. Wing Jr., mayor of Auburn

References

External links

 Edward Little High School website

Public high schools in Maine
Educational institutions established in 1834
Schools in Lewiston–Auburn, Maine
Education in Auburn, Maine
Buildings and structures in Auburn, Maine
1834 establishments in Maine